The Manchester Coalfield is part of the South Lancashire Coalfield, the coal seams of which were laid down in the Carboniferous Period. Some easily accessible seams were worked on a small scale from the Middle Ages, and extensively from the beginning of the Industrial Revolution in the early 19th century until the last quarter of the 20th century. The Coal Measures lie above a bed of Millstone Grit and are interspersed with sandstones, mudstones, shales, and fireclays. The Lower Coal Measures occupy the high ground of the West Pennine Moors above Bolton and are not worked in the Manchester Coalfield. The most productive of the coal measures are the lower two thirds of the Middle Coal Measures where coal is mined from seams between the Worsley Four Foot and Arley mines. The deepest and most productive collieries were to the south of the coalfield. The coalfield is affected by the northwest to southeast aligned Pendleton Fault along the Irwell Valley and the Rossendale Valley anticline. The Coal Measures generally dip towards the south and west. Numerous other smaller faults affect the coalfield. The Upper Coal Measures are not worked in the Manchester Coalfield.

The early coal pits were dug to the shallow seams where they outcropped, particularly in the Irwell Valley and in Atherton. The early collieries were adits or bell pits exploiting the Worsley Four Foot Mine. Deeper mines were sunk when steam engines were developed to pump water from the shafts. Most collieries to the east of the Pendleton Fault had closed before 1929. A group of independent companies formed Manchester Collieries in 1929, to work the reserves of the coalfield.

Coal seams of the West Manchester Coalfield
In this part of Lancashire a coal seam is referred to as a mine and the coal mine is a colliery or pit. The beds of coal in the Coal Measures are separated by layers of gritstones, sandstones, shales and mudstones of varying thicknesses. The mines were frequently named after their thickness – Yard, Three Quarters – or given local names in the areas in which they were first worked.

Central Manchester Coalfield

The eastern part of the coalfield under Manchester is isolated from the rest. The sequence of coal seams corresponds more closely with that of the Oldham Coalfield than the rest of the Manchester Coalfield. Workable seams are close to the surface and coal from the deep Roger mine was considered to be of the highest quality. The Upper Coal Measures above the Worsley Four Foot mine, known as the Parker mine, are worked in this part of the coalfield and known as the Bradford Group, above which is the Ardwick Group.

The coal seams of the Bradford Group are the Two Foot, Doctor, New, Yard, Bradford Foor Foot, Three Quarters and Charlotte mines, the Charlotte being closest to the surface. The Openshaw mine above the Charlotte was worked for fireclay. The Top, Middle and Deep mines correspond to the Major, Bland and Ashton Great mines in the Oldham Coalfield. The Crumbouke mine in the western coalfield is the Roger mine in central Manchester.

See also
List of collieries in Astley and Tyldesley

References

Citations

Bibliography

 
Coal mining regions in England
Geology of England
History of Greater Manchester